The 2016 FIBA U16 European Championship Division B was played in Sofia, Bulgaria, from 11 to 20 August 2016. 24 teams participated in the competition. Russia won the tournament for the first time, with Israel finishing second.

Participating teams

  (14th place, 2015 FIBA Europe Under-16 Championship Division A)

  (15th place, 2015 FIBA Europe Under-16 Championship Division A)

  (suspended from 2015 FIBA Europe Under-16 Championship Division A)

First round

Group A

Group B

Group C

Group D

17th–24th place playoffs

9th–16th place playoffs

Championship playoffs

Final standings

Awards
Most Valuable Player

 Alexander Shashkov

All-Tournament Team

 Alexander Shashkov
 Konstantin Shevchuk
 Eidan Alber
 Denys Klevzunyk
 Nik Dragan

References

External links
FIBA official website

FIBA U16 European Championship Division B
B
2016–17 in European basketball
2016–17 in Bulgarian basketball
International youth basketball competitions hosted by Bulgaria
Sports competitions in Sofia
August 2016 sports events in Europe